South Dakota v. Bourland, 508 U.S. 679 (1993), was a case in which the Supreme Court of the United States held that Congress specifically abrogated treaty rights with the Cheyenne River Sioux Tribe as to hunting and fishing rights on reservation lands that were acquired for a reservoir.

Background

History
In 1868, the Fort Laramie Treaty,  was signed between the United States and the Sioux Indian Tribe.  This reservation covered almost the entire present day state of South Dakota, but was broken up into six separate reservations in 1889, one of which was the Cheyenne River Indian Reservation.

In 1934, in accordance with the Indian Reorganization Act, the Cheyenne River Sioux Tribe developed a tribal constitution and enacted tribal laws regulating hunting and fishing on the reservation.  In 1953, Congress passed Public Law 280 which granted South Dakota certain jurisdiction over the reservation, but reserved tribal hunting and fishing laws and regulations to tribal jurisdiction.

In 1944, Congress passed the Flood Control Act which allowed the government to purchase land along the Missouri River to build dams.  In 1950, Congress passed the Cheyenne River Act which transferred approximately  acres from the tribe for approximately $10,000,000.00.  The act specifically reserved hunting and fishing rights on the land to the tribe.  The tribe and South Dakota thereafter negotiated hunting and fishing agreements where the tribe would honor state hunting licenses on the reservation, until 1988 when they could not reach an agreement.  The tribe then stated it would not honor state hunting licenses.

Lower Courts
South Dakota then filed suit in the United States District Court for the District of South Dakota, seeking an injunction to prevent the tribe from enforcing its regulations on non-Indian fee land and land taken under the Cheyenne River Act, but was still within the reservation boundaries.  The District Court found for South Dakota and issued the injunction.  The tribe then appealed to the Eighth Circuit Court of Appeals.  The Court of Appeals affirmed in part, reversed in part, and remanded in part.

The Eighth Circuit held that the tribe had the authority to regulate hunting and fishing since Congress did not explicitly revoke that authority, but that on non-Indian fee land that had been acquired by the government, the tribe's authority had been divested unless certain exceptions were met, to be determined by further action in the District Court.  South Dakota appealed and the United States Supreme Court granted certiorari.

Opinion of the Court
Reversed. Justice Clarence Thomas delivered the opinion of the court. Thomas first went through the Cheyenne River Act and covered what each relevant section stated. Citing Menominee Tribe v. United States,  and Montana v. United States, Thomas noted that Congress has the power to abrogate treaty provisions but that they must "clearly express its intent to do so." Although Thomas indicated that such an abrogation be clearly expressed, he found that the statutes in question "implies the loss of regulatory jurisdiction" by the tribe. Although Thomas found that the statute implied the loss rather than clearly stated it, he reversed the opinion of the Eighth Circuit Court.

Dissent
Justice Harry Blackmun issued a dissenting opinion, joined by Justice Souter.  Blackmun went into detail pointing out the difference between an explicit abrogation and an implied abrogation.  Blackmun would have upheld the decision of the Court of Appeals.

See also
List of United States Supreme Court cases, volume 508

References

External links
 

1993 in United States case law
United States Supreme Court cases
Lakota
United States Native American treaty case law
Native American history of South Dakota
1993 in South Dakota
Legal history of South Dakota
United States Supreme Court cases of the Rehnquist Court